Genuardi's Family Markets L.P. was a chain of supermarkets located in the Northeastern United States. Family-owned until purchased by Safeway in 2000, Genuardi's had its headquarters in the Bentwood Executive Campus in East Norriton Township, Pennsylvania in Greater Philadelphia.

After many of its remaining stores were sold or closed, there was a Safeway-owned store under the former chain's name located in Audubon, Pennsylvania that remained open until May 2015.

History

Beginning
In 1920, Gaspare and Josephine Genuardi owned a farm near Norristown, Pennsylvania and grew fruits and vegetables. The couple went around to their neighbors delivering produce to them. Gaspare and Josephine were the parents of nine children. Of the nine were Charlie, Frank, Tom, Joe, and Jim who helped out with the business. The five sons soon became known as the "Genuardi brothers" by the customers.

The Genuardi family opened its first supermarket in Norristown in 1954, which until its closure was the oldest surviving Genuardi's in operation. Relatives of the Genuardi family also maintain a nursery and florist in Norristown.

1950s, 1960s, and 1970s
The five Genuardi brothers expanded their supermarkets throughout the western Philadelphia suburbs, spanning Bucks, Delaware, Chester, and Montgomery counties. The company has never had any stores within Philadelphia city limits. In 1975, it acquired some former Pantry Pride (originally known as Food Fair) and A&P stores, and more ex-A&P properties rejected by Super Fresh in 1985.

1980s and 1990s
The chain's first surviving stores outside Norristown opened in the 1980s. As the 1990s approached, the five brothers decided to transfer ownership of the stores to a third generation of family, which consisted of Jim Jr., Joe Jr., Charles A., Larry, Tom Jr., Michael, Anthony, Skip, and David Genuardi. Charles A. was named President/CEO of Genuardi's Family Markets. Also during this time, it owned a discount grocery chain called Mad Grocer. In the late 1990s, the company expanded into Delaware and New Jersey.

Safeway buyout of Genuardi's Family Markets
In February 2001, the Genuardi family sold the chain to Safeway. In the summer of 2004, all Genuardi's stores in Delaware were converted to the Safeway banner when they were unionized. Safeway already had stores of its own in southern Delaware. There were issues and local outrage over the Safeway takeover due to claims of price increases, the changeover of many products to Safeway's own brands, and the use of a loyalty card, which was not needed under Genuardi's previous ownership. Except for the Safeway conversions, Genuardi's remained non-union, despite heavy unionization in Safeway's other chains.

2000s and early 2010s downfall

In 2005, grocery delivery was added to select Genuardi's stores. This allowed customers to order groceries via the Genuardi's/Safeway websites and have it delivered by truck in a set time frame. Later on in the year, Genuardi's closed two underperforming stores in East Windsor, New Jersey and Bensalem, Pennsylvania, the latter of which was converted to a ShopRite.

During 2010, underperforming Genuardi's stores did not have their leases renewed and Safeway closed store locations in Newtown Square (Edgmont), Glen Mills, Chesterbrook, and Lansdale in Pennsylvania, and Voorhees in New Jersey.

In September 2011, Safeway was looking to sell all or part of Genuardi's. Later that month, a sale of several of Genuardi's locations to Giant-Carlisle appeared to be imminent.

On January 5, 2012, Giant announced its deal to acquire 15 Genuardi's Family Markets across the Philadelphia area in a $106 million deal. For three weeks in July 2012, Giant opened 5 of the former Genuardi's stores each week.

Weis Markets announced on February 13, 2012, the purchase of three stores in Montgomery and Bucks counties. The three Weis stores opened on June 16, 2012.

Although it was initially to be acquired by Giant, it was announced on June 6, 2012, that the Newtown store would instead become a McCaffrey's Food Markets. The Newtown store became a McCaffrey's on July 15.

After failing to find a buyer for the location, the Cherry Hill store closed on August 4, 2012, and later became Whole Foods Market.

The Barnegat and Egg Harbor Township/Northfield stores closed on December 12, 2012, the Barnegat store was to re-open as Safeway's sister chain Acme in 2016 and the Egg Harbor Township/Northfield store became JR's Fresh Market in 2015 but that closed in 2018 and became Lidl in 2021.

The Marlton store closed on February 12, 2013.

The Audubon store, the last remaining store, closed on May 27, 2015.

Acme Markets, the chain's long-time rival, announced in late 2015 it would reopen the closed Barnegat location as an Acme; this was made possible when Albertsons (Acme's parent firm) merged with Safeway earlier in the year, and Safeway continued to hold the location's lease long after it closed. The store reopened as an Acme on February 5, 2016.

References

Sources
Genuardi Family Markets Employee Handbook, 1995.

External links
  (Archive)

Defunct supermarkets of the United States
Safeway Inc.
Defunct companies based in Pennsylvania
American companies established in 1920
Food and drink companies established in 1920
Retail companies established in 1920
Food and drink companies disestablished in 2012
Retail companies disestablished in 2012
1920 establishments in Pennsylvania
2012 disestablishments in Pennsylvania
Family-owned companies of the United States